Elise Bjørnebekk-Waagen  (born 19 February 1990) is a Norwegian politician. 
She was elected representative from the constituency of Østfold to the Storting for the period 2017–2021 for the Labour Party. She was re-elected for the period 2021–2025.

Bjørnebekk-Waagen was among the survivors from the Utøya massacre in 2011, where she was shot in the knee.

References

1990 births
Living people
Labour Party (Norway) politicians
Members of the Storting
Østfold politicians
Survivors of the 2011 Norway attacks